Panderichthyidae is a family of prehistoric lobe-finned fishes which lived during the Late Devonian period.

References 

Elpistostegalians
Late Devonian fish
Devonian bony fish
Prehistoric lobe-finned fish families
Late Devonian first appearances
Late Devonian animals
Late Devonian extinctions